William Fairfield Warren (March 13, 1833 – December 7, 1929) was the first president of Boston University.

Biography

Born in Williamsburg, Massachusetts, he graduated from Wesleyan University, Middletown, Connecticut (1853), and there became a member of the Mystical Seven. He later studied at Andover Theological Seminary and at Berlin and Halle.  He entered the New England Conference in 1855 and was professor of systematic theology in the Methodist Episcopal Missionary Institute at Bremen, Germany (1860–1866).  He was acting president of the Boston University School of Theology (1866–1873), president of Boston University (1873–1903), and dean of the Boston University School of Theology (1903–1911). After 1873 he was also professor of comparative theology and philosophy of religion. He published:
The True Key of Ancient Cosmology (1882)
Paradise Found—the Cradle of the Human Race at the North Pole (1885)
The Quest of the Perfect Religion (1886)
In the Footsteps of Arminius (1888)
The Story of Gottlieb (1890)
Religions of the World and the World Religion (1900)
The Earliest Cosmologies (1909)
The Universe as Pictured in Milton's Paradise Lost (1915)

When Boston University was chartered in 1869, he helped make it the first university in the country fully open to women. He also helped create Wellesley College in 1870.  He was the brother of Henry White Warren.

In 1861, he married Harriet Merrick Warren, the first editor of The Heathen Woman's Friend. He died at his home in Brookline, Massachusetts on December 7, 1929, at the age of 96.

Cradle of the Human Race at the North Pole

Warren wrote a book promoting his belief that the original centre of mankind once sat at the North Pole entitled Paradise Found: The Cradle of the Human Race at the North Pole (1885). In this work Warren placed Atlantis at the North Pole, as well as the Garden of Eden, Mount Meru, Avalon and Hyperborea. Warren believed all these mythical lands were folk memories of a former inhabited far northern seat where man was originally created.

Warren's identification of Atlantis with the North Pole was maintained by positioning Atlas in the far north by mapping out ancient Greek cosmology. Warren equated the primordial Titan Atlas of Greek mythology who supported the Heavens on his shoulders (or supported the earth on a pillar) to the Atlas described in Plato's dialogue Critias as the first ruler of Atlantis (Critias, 114a). In Warren's view, all the axis mundi or cosmic-axis of ancient legends (Yggdrasil, Irminsul and Atlas' pillar) had to be in the far north "at the top of the world":

Warren noted how Homer, Virgil and Hesiod all placed Atlas or his world pillar at the "ends of the earth", meaning in his view the far northern arctic regions, while Euripides related Atlas to the Pole Star. Therefore, in Warren's view Atlantis sat in the far north, at the North Pole, since the Atlas in his ancient Greek cosmological mapping stood in the far northern zenith, under the Pole Star.

Bal Gangadhar Tilak, an Indian nationalist and historian, quotes extensively from this book and presents his own studies of Vedas and Persian Avesta in his book The Arctic Home in the Vedas arguing for the presence of ancient humans in the Arctic.

References

Further reading
"W.F. Warren Dies, Noted Educator; President Emeritus and a Founder of Boston University Was in His 97th Year. Widely Known Organizer Helped Start Wellesley College and Other Institutions—Was Also a Prominent Theologian.",  The New York Times

External links

1833 births
1929 deaths
People from Williamsburg, Massachusetts
American Methodist clergy
American expatriates in Germany
Arminian writers
Arminian theologians
Presidents of Boston University
American religious writers
Wesleyan University alumni
Boston University faculty
19th-century Methodist ministers
20th-century Methodist ministers
Pseudoarchaeologists
Pseudohistorians
Atlantis proponents